Power cycle may refer to:
 Power cycling, the act of turning a piece of equipment off and then on again
 Thermodynamic power cycle, a linked sequence of thermodynamic processes that forms the basis of an engine
 Duty cycle, the fraction of a period of time in which a signal or system is active